Dublin Community Television (DCTV) is a not-for-profit co-operative television station in Ireland, broadcasting from the country's capital, Dublin. The channel launched on 16 July 2008.

Programming
Programmes for DCTV are created and produced by sources which include:

Not-for-profit TV production companies, such as NEAR TV Productions in Coolock
Other DCTV member organisations, such as AONTAS (adult education), Cultivate (sustainable living), Project (arts); NALA (adult literacy)
Individual members of DCTV

The station also shows international material such as Democracy Now! which has been broadcast nightly since 2010.

Background
DCTV is Ireland's only democratically controlled TV channel. All content is released to a Creative Commons/Non-commercial licence.

Dublin Community Television (DCTV) secured a 10-year Community Licence from the Broadcasting Authority of Ireland (BAI). It is also Ireland's only TV station run by a members' cooperative and Dublin's only community TV station. It has offices in The Digital Hub in Dublin.

Special Schemes are initiatives which fall outside the regular funding rounds and have a distinct focus on partnerships and the fostering of industry development. While content will deal with the core themes of BCI Sound & Vision, the Special Scheme takes a holistic view of the programme-making process, from development to production according to the BCI.

Co-operative information
DCTV is a member's co-operative, with schedules, programme commissioning and all other decisions being taken by members of the cooperative. There is no standard advertising, and DCTV is funded by membership fees and a variety of other sources: Dublin City Council, other Dublin councils and the Dublin Community Forum. Some of the programmes made for DCTV are funded by the BCI's Sound and Vision fund, which is generated from the Irish TV licence fee.

Membership costs €25 a year (€15 for unwaged), giving the member a say in running the station and choosing programming and gives access to the means to make programmes for DCTV.

Launch
Dublin Community Television was launched on 16 July 2008 by Minister Eamon Ryan, Department of Communications, Energy & Natural Resources.

The channel airs features and shorts (both documentary and drama), cookery programmes, adult literacy programmes, activist and college films, community programming, films by young/emerging film-makers and sports (with an emphasis on minority sports).

Its own productions are intended to be produced under a Creative Commons license that allows non-profit use, subject to recognition of source. DCTV also promotes sharing with other community channels.

References

External links

Television stations in Ireland
Mass media companies of Ireland
Television channels and stations established in 2008